Unin may refer to:
 United Nations Institute for Namibia, an educational system set up in Zambia by the United Nations
Unín (Brno-Country District), Czech Republic
Unín, Skalica District, Slovakia
Unin, Masovian Voivodeship (east-central Poland)
Unin, West Pomeranian Voivodeship (north-west Poland)